The rastacap or tam is a tall (depending on the user's hair length), round, crocheted cap. It is most commonly associated with the pat as a way for Rastafari (Rastas) and others with dreadlocks to tuck their hair away, but may be worn for religious reasons by Rastafari. It is sometimes erroneously referred to as a "Tam", a different kind of cap loosely ancestral to the rastacap. Other Caribbean terms for the rastacap include: rastafar (sometimes with a silent -r), toppa, toppah, and simply cap or hat.

In construction, the rastacap is similar to the tuque, but much larger. Most commonly crocheted, the hat can also be knit, woven, sewn, or constructed in a number of other ways. Examples with sun-cured palm leaves woven into the hat exist; this yields a semi-rigid design which a skilled islander can form rapidly. Rastacaps range in size and shape, as well as uses. People with dreadlocks and non-dreaded people alike wear rastacaps for fashion, convenience, religion, socio-political statement, and a number of other reasons. Some Rastas also wear rastacaps and other forms of headdress as a religious headcovering. It may also be worn by health and food service and heavy machinery workers with long hair, for workplace safety reasons.

References

External links 
 

Caps
Rastafari